Cornaredo Stadium is a multi-purpose stadium in Lugano, Switzerland.  It is used mostly for football matches. It is a home ground of FC Lugano. The stadium is able to hold 15,000 people and was built in 1951. The stadium has 5,000 seats and 10,000 standing places. During the 1954 FIFA World Cup, it hosted one game.

During the spring 2008, the political authorities of Lugano announced a plan to renew the stadium to fulfil the Swiss Football League requirements for Super League stadiums, however, the works never commenced.

1954 FIFA World Cup

See also 
List of football stadiums in Switzerland

References

External links
Profile at worldstadiums.com

Football venues in Switzerland
Sports venues in Ticino
1954 FIFA World Cup stadiums
Multi-purpose stadiums in Switzerland
Athletics (track and field) venues in Switzerland